In financial mathematics, the Carr–Madan formula of Peter Carr and Dilip B. Madan shows that the analytical solution of the European option price can be obtained once the explicit form of the characteristic function of , where  is the price of the underlying asset at time , is available. This analytical solution is in the form of the Fourier transform, which then allows for the fast Fourier transform to be employed to numerically compute option values and Greeks in an efficient manner.

References

Further reading 

 .

Mathematical finance
Special functions
Financial models
Options_(finance)
Fourier analysis